is a Japanese professional wrestler best known for her mainstream popularity in the 1980s as a member of the tag team Crush Gals with long-time partner Lioness Asuka. She was the founder of the GAEA Women's Professional Wrestling organization (known simply as GAEA). She briefly competed as alter-ego Lady Zero in GAEA. Nagayo appears in the 2000 documentary Gaea Girls made for the BBC by Kim Longinotto and Jano Williams. Nagayo has been called "the most popular woman wrestler of all-time".

Professional wrestling career

All Japan Women's Pro-Wrestling (1980-1986)
Nagayo debuted on August 8, 1980, for All Japan Women's Pro-Wrestling against Yukari Omori. She cried upon losing and was scolded by Tommy Aoyama, a member of the Queen's Angels, who was retiring that night. Through 1981, she only wrestled eight times due to the promotion having too many wrestlers.

On January 4, 1983, Nagayo was matched against her future partner and one half of the future Crush Gals, Lioness Asuka. They had a standout performance and got a good reaction, which lead to them becoming partners. The Crush Gal name was created from a combination of a nickname of Akira Maeda and a Japanese magazine called, "Gals". The team gained popularity after a losing effort on August 27, 1983, in a WWWA Tag Title match against Yukari Omori and Jumbo Hori. The teams wrestled again in January 1984 to a 60-minute draw. They then wrestled to another 60 minute draw against Jaguar Yokota and Devil Masami in June 1984 to a crowd of 5,000 fans. The team released their first music single on August 21, 1984, called "Bible of Fire", eventually selling over 100,000 copies. Nagayo claimed to have never sang in public prior to this single.

On August 25, 1984, Crush Gals finally defeated their rivals Omori and Hori, capturing the WWWA World Tag Team Championship. In 1985, Crush Gals began their rivalry with Dump Matsumoto's heel stable, Gokuaku Domei ("Atrocious Alliance"). The feud drew consistent ratings over 12.0 for AJW's weekly television program on Fuji TV. Nagayo claimed she had to move frequently during this time due to large amounts of fans waiting outside her home. On February 25, 1985, Matsumoto and Crane Yu defeated Crush Gals for the WWWA tag titles. In June 1985, Nagayo competed in the 1985 Japan Grand Prix, losing in the semi-finals to Matsumoto.  On August 28, 1985, Nagayo and Matsumoto met in a hair vs. hair match. Nagayo lost the highly acclaimed match, having her head shaved which shocked the crowd. Soon after, Nagayo was able to get some revenge when The Crush Girls defeated The Atrocious Alliance to win the 1985 Tag League the Best. However, Nagayo suffered a knee injury in December 1985, which caused Crush Gals to vacate the WWWA tag titles and for Nagayo to miss some of early 1986. On March 20, 1986, Crush Gals re-captured the WWWA tag titles from The Jumping Bomb Angels, who had won the vacated belts. Nagayo and Matsumoto continued April 5, 1986 match against Matsumoto at Ryōgoku Kokugikan where Nagayo won.

End of Crush Gals (1986-1989)

In May 1986, Crush Gals suspended all non-wrestling activities and soon after broke up. Nagayo competed in the 1986 Japan Grand Prix, losing in the finals to rival Yukari Omori.  The feud between Nagayo and Matsumoto still continued on though and the two met in a second hair vs hair match after an incident where the Atrocious Alliance cut up Nagayo's clothes after a performance. The rematch was held on November 7, 1986, with Nagayo gaining revenge and cutting Matsumoto's hair. On February 26, 1987, Nagayo and Asuka clashed in a #1 Contender's Match for the WWWA World Single Championship. The match went to a 30-minute draw. They were given an additional five minutes but when no winner was decided, the match went to a referee's decision where Asuka was awarded the victory.

Nagayo won the 1987 Japan Grand Prix.The tournament was marred by multiple wrestlers leaving the tournament prematurely but it featured another Nagayo vs Asuka match before Nagayo defeated Matsumoto in the finals. On October 20, 1987, Nagayo met rival Yukari Omori in title vs title match, with Nagayo putting up her All Pacific Championship against Omori's WWWA World Single Championship with Nagayo winning. After winning both the 1987 Japan Grand Prix and the WWWA title, Nagayo was awarded the 1987 All Japan Women's MVP award. Nagayo finished off the year on December 26, 1987, by competing against Devil Masami in Devil's retirement match. On January 5, 1988, Nagayo and Omori had their last singles match against each other for the WWWA title with Nagayo winning.

On February 25, 1988, two of Nagayo's main rivals, Matsumoto and Omori retired. To mark this occasion, Nagayo and Asuka teamed up to take on the oddball pairing of Dump Matsumoto and Yukari Omori. Later that night, Nagayo pleaded with Matsumoto to team together one time before they retired. They wrestled a five-minute exhibition against Asuka and Yukari Omori. The show drew a 13.3 rating, making it the most watched wrestling event in Japan in 1988.

Nagayo held the WWWA title throughout August 25, 1988, when she lost the title to Lioness Asuka, who vacated it upon winning it due to Nagayo's arm injury. Nagayo toured North America in October 1988, wrestling for  World Class Championship Wrestling's 5th Annual Cotton Bowl Extravaganza, Stampede Wrestling and for Consejo Mundial de Lucha Libre.

Nagayo and Asuka met in a WWWA title rematch on January 22, 1989, with Asuka winning. On March 4, 1989, Crush Gals won the WWWA Tag Titles for the last time from The Calgary Typhoons of Yumi Ogura and Mika Komatsu. They vacated the titles in May.

In 1989, Nagayo reached age 26, the mandatory retirement age for female wrestlers in AJW at the time. Nagayo claimed to be getting married, however later admitted that it was a lie. Nagayo retired at WrestleMarine Piad '89 on May 6, 1989. In Nagayo's retirement match, she teamed with Lioness Asuka against Mitsuko Nishiwaki and Akira Hokuto. However, four impromptu exhibition matches followed including the final Crush Girls vs Jumping Bomb Angels match and one final match between Nagayo and Asuka.

First Retirement 

Nagayo did work in theatre and in 1991 performed in a play called, "Ring! Ring! Ring!", which was about women's wrestling. She also appeared on a television show as a physical education teacher. She said was encouraged by Kōhei Tsuka to return to wrestling.

Return to Wrestling 
Nagayo returned from retirement at All Japan Women's Pro Wrestling Dream Slam 1 on April 2, 1993, losing to Devil Masami. She also wrestled at All Japan Women's Big Egg Wrestling Universe on November 20, 1994, defeating Reggie Bennett.

Gaea Japan (1995-2005)
Nagayo made her full-time return at  Gaea Japan's first show on April 15, 1995. She wrestled as one of GAEA's main eventers and top faces.

Nagayo appeared for World Championship Wrestling in 1996, competing in the tournament for the WCW Women's Championship as she would be defeated by Madusa on the December 14 edition of Nitro. After the departure of then champion Akira Hokuto, she would appear on the September 20, 1997 edition of WCW Japan competing for the vacant title though would be defeated by Devil Masami.

In December 1998, Asuka debuted in GAEA and played a heel, allying with Nagayo's rivals and winning the presidency of GAEA from Nagayo in their first match together in ten years, on April 4, 1999. Eventually, however, on December 27, 1999, Crush Gals re-united, and went on to win their fourth tag team championship together in spring 2004.

On April 3, 2005, Nagayo and Asuka teamed up for the last time, defeating Chikayo Nagashima and Sugar Sato on GAEA's 10th Anniversary Show; Asuka retired afterwards because of neck injuries. Nagayo retired a week later after losing to her protégée, Meiko Satomura in the main event of GAEA's Eternal Last Gong Show, the promotion's farewell card.

Post-retirement
Following her retirement, Nagayo began producing her own independent events. She wrestled her return match at the second event on April 15, 2005, where she, Ryuji Ito and Sanshiro Takagi defeated Mayumi Ozaki,  Abdullah Kobayashi and Shadow WX in a Fluorescent Lighttubes & Barbed Wire Alpha Death match. She also produced and wrestled at Devil Masami's retirement event in December 2008. For the next five years, Nagayo did not produce another event and remained outside of professional wrestling circles, before returning in late 2013 to take part in a storyline at Sendai Girls' Pro Wrestling, where she took Meiko Satomura trainee Kagetsu under her wing. On December 11, 2013, Nagayo announced that she would return to the ring at her self-produced event on March 22, 2014, when she would face Dump Matsumoto in a six-woman tag team match. In the match, Nagayo, Kagetsu and Takumi Iroha defeated Matsumoto, Kaoru and Yoshiko with Nagayo pinning Matsumoto for the win. At the end of the event, Nagayo announced she was planning on starting her own promotion named Marvelous. Nagayo began signing wrestlers for Marvelous in early 2015. In May 2015, Nagayo revealed that Marvelous was also scheduled to feature male wrestlers, while also announcing that she was returning to the United States to hold tryouts for the promotion, which was scheduled to launch in the spring of 2016. On September 12, Nagayo and Atsushi Onita defeated Dump Matsumoto and Taru to become the inaugural Bakuha-ō ("Blast King") Tag Team Champions. The title was promoted by Onita as part of his Chō Hanabi Puroresu shows. Marvelous held its first event on May 3, 2016.

Championships and accomplishments
All Japan Women's Pro-Wrestling
AJW Junior Championship (2 times)
All Pacific Championship (2 times)
IWA World Women's Championship (2 times)
WWWA World Single Championship (1 time)
WWWA World Tag Team Championship (4 times) – with Lioness Asuka
Japan Grand Prix (1987)
Tag League the Best (1986) – with Yumiko Hotta
Tag League the Best (1987) – with Lioness Asuka
AJW Hall of Fame (Class of 1998)
Cauliflower Alley Club
Other honoree (1996)
Chō Hanabi Puroresu
Bakuha-ō Championship (1 time)
Bakuha-ō Tag Team Championship (1 time) – with Atsushi Onita
Bakujoō Championship (1 time, inaugural)
GAEA Japan
AAAW Heavyweight Championship (1 time)
AAAW Single Championship (1 time)
AAAW Tag Team Championship (1 time) – with Lioness Asuka
Tokyo Sports
Best Tag Team Award (2015) with Atsushi Onita
Wrestling Observer Newsletter awards
Wrestling Observer Newsletter Hall of Fame (Class of 1997)

References

External links

 A Brief History of The Crush Gals

1964 births
Japanese female professional wrestlers
Living people
Professional wrestling executives
Stampede Wrestling alumni
20th-century professional wrestlers
21st-century professional wrestlers
AAAW Single Champions
AAAW Tag Team Champions